Richard Peduzzi (born 1943 in Argentan, Orne) is a French scenographer. He was the director of the French Academy in Rome from September 2002 to August 2008.

Since 1969, he has decorated the sets designed by Patrice Chéreau, and together they have put on several dramatic texts by Bernard-Marie Koltès.  In the theatre, they participated in the centennial productions of Der Ring des Nibelungen at Bayreuth under the direction of Pierre Boulez.  For the Opéra National de Paris, they presented Alban Berg's Lulu, and Jacques Offenbach's The Tales of Hoffmann, and for the La Scala, Milan, they collaborated on Wagner's Tristan und Isolde (2007).  Peduzzi also created films with Chéreau, such as La Reine Margot and Ceux qui m'aiment prendront le train.  He was nominated for a César Award for Best Production Design in 1976 for his work on La Chair de l'orchidée.

Peduzzi's sets are often formed of large vertical masses symbolising the dangers that threaten the characters.

External links
  Biography on Arts vivants
  Biography on Radio-France
 Mobilier national : Richard Peduzzi

1943 births
Living people
People from Argentan
French scenic designers
French production designers